Daouda Diakité (born 30 March 1983) is a Burkinabé football goalkeeper.

Diakité capped with the Burkina Faso national football team, and played at the 2003 FIFA World Youth Championship.

External links
 

1983 births
Living people
Burkinabé footballers
Burkina Faso international footballers
2010 Africa Cup of Nations players
2012 Africa Cup of Nations players
2013 Africa Cup of Nations players
Planète Champion players
Étoile Filante de Ouagadougou players
Association football goalkeepers
Al Mokawloon Al Arab SC players
KFC Turnhout players
Lierse S.K. players
Burkinabé expatriate footballers
Expatriate footballers in Egypt
Expatriate footballers in Belgium
Burkinabé expatriate sportspeople in Egypt
Burkinabé expatriate sportspeople in Belgium
Sportspeople from Ouagadougou
CF Mounana players
Expatriate footballers in Gabon
Burkinabé expatriate sportspeople in Gabon
Free State Stars F.C. players
Expatriate soccer players in South Africa
Burkinabé expatriate sportspeople in South Africa
AS Vita Club players
AS Tanda players
Expatriate footballers in the Democratic Republic of the Congo
Burkinabé expatriate sportspeople in the Democratic Republic of the Congo
Expatriate footballers in Ivory Coast
Burkinabé expatriate sportspeople in Ivory Coast
Egyptian Premier League players
Burkinabé Premier League players
Ligue 1 (Ivory Coast) players
21st-century Burkinabé people